Urr Water or River Urr (arc. River Orr) is a river in which flows through the counties of Dumfriesshire and Kirkcudbrightshire in southwest Scotland.

Course
Entirely within Dumfries and Galloway, the Urr Water originates at Loch Urr and flows for thirty-five miles southwards past Corsock, Glenlair, Auchendolly, Bridge of Urr, Haugh of Urr, and close to Dalbeattie, via Palnackie to the Solway Firth at Rough Firth. The village of Kippford stands near the head of the firth where the Urr Water reaches the sea; the only other coastal settlement of any size is Rockcliffe. The principal settlement on the river is Dalbeattie. The river is noted for salmon fishing.

Etymology
The name 'Urr' is from Cumbric or 'a border, boundary, limit'.

Gallery
Urr Water

Urr Estuary

References

Rivers of Dumfries and Galloway